John Chick (25 August 1932 – 17 March 2013) was an Australian rules footballer who played with Carlton in the VFL during the 1950s.

Chick began and ended his career in Tasmania but in between spent nine VFL seasons at Carlton. A pacy wingman, he joined Carlton from New Town where he had played in their 1951 TANFL premiership side.

He was vice captain of Carlton in his last two seasons and represented Victoria at the 1956 Perth Carnival where his performances earned him selection in the All-Australian team.

After leaving Carlton he returned to his old club, now renamed Glenorchy, and was appointed captain-coach. He steered them to the 1961 Grand Final but they could not win the premiership. He was later named on the interchange bench in the club's official 'Team of the Century'.

John Chick was inducted into the Tasmanian Football Hall of Fame in 2005.

References

External links

Profile at Blueseum

1932 births
2013 deaths
Australian rules footballers from Tasmania
Carlton Football Club players
Glenorchy Football Club players
Glenorchy Football Club coaches
North Hobart Football Club coaches
All-Australians (1953–1988)
Tasmanian Football Hall of Fame inductees